Pydnae, Pydna or Pydnai was a small Hellenistic town on the coast of ancient Lycia in Asiatic Turkey between the river Xanthus and Cape Hieron.   Ptolemy calls the town Kydna or Cydna, and places it at the foot of Mount Cragus.

The site is at the western end of the 12km Patara Beach, and occupies the eastern slope of a hill near the shore; the walls are of well-preserved polygonal masonry, with eleven towers and seven stairways leading up to the battlements. The only building in the interior is a small church. Four or five inscriptions have been found in and around the fort; all are of Imperial date. It is mentioned in G.E. Bean's Lycian Turkey: An Archaeological Guide.  

Pydnae is near Ozlen, on the Gâvur Ağlı, or Gavurağılı, to Patara stage of the Lycian Way, a 540 km way-marked footpath around the coast of Lycia from Fethiye to Antalya.

References

Populated places in ancient Lycia
Former populated places in Turkey
Ancient Greek archaeological sites in Turkey